The Estonian Native, (or Klepper), is an Estonian breed of small horse. It is strong and is resistant to disease. It is one of three recognised horse breeds in Estonia, the others being the Tori and the Estonian Draft, both of which derive from it. It has also influenced other Northern European breeds such as the Latvian Warmblood, and the Vyatka and the extinct Obva in Russia. It is an endangered breed; the population fell from about 16000 in the 1950s to approximately 500 in 2004.

History 

During the eleventh century, the chronicler Adam of Bremen considered the Estonians to be rich in gold and good horses.

Estonian horses were exported to Russia through Novgorod in the fourteenth and fifteenth centuries.

The first documented attempts to improve the Estonian Native date from after the foundation in 1856 of the Tori stud farm in Tori, in Pärnu County in south-western Estonia, where the original native was selectively bred. It was also cross-bred with light draught and riding horse breeds, which led to the creation of the Tori.

After the First World War a breeding program was created to help preserve the breed whose numbers had fallen quite a lot during the war. "Estonian Native Horse Breeders Society" and an Estonian Horse studbook were founded in 1921. By 1937, only 13 stallions had been used, and the Estonian horse was becoming inbred due to the scarcity of strains. This led to horses reaching maturity later, and slowed down the development of the breed. With the mechanisation of transport and agriculture, horses became obsolete and the breed nearly died out, excluding the islands of Saaremaa and Hiiumaa. With a few animals left on the mainland, the breed was eventually revived with the help of a new breeding program, and the breed's population has now reached circa 1000 animals in Estonia. The breed has recently been crossbred with Finnhorses to enhance its size.

In 1992 the association started anew after having been down for the 1980s. In 2000, an association was founded to preserve the breed. 

It is believed that the breed became mixed with the now extinct Öland Horse, as large numbers of Öland Horses were exported to Estonia at one point. Tests authorised by associations dedicated to the Öland Horse have revealed that these two breeds have a genetically similar background. In 2005, 25 animals of the breed were imported to Sweden to recreate the genetically closely related, extinct Öland Horse. The new Öland horse is not called that, however, but the "Estonian Bush Pony".

Characteristics 
It is small horse, standing  at the withers. It is strong, yet not heavily built. The most common colourations are black, bay, chestnut, and grey. The breed is a tireless and powerful puller, and is well suited to agricultural work with its easy temperament. This has contributed for the breed's use as a children's riding horse, a major reason for why the breed was able to survive.

Most breeders let their herds live under natural pasture conditions except during wintertime, and the breed lives well on forage alone. This has made the breed healthy and durable with hard feet. Their appearance is not exceptional. The head is small with straight profile and primitive facial features. The breed is willing and easy to handle, inexpensive to keep, and often long-lived. The breed is nowadays used for tourist rides. Finland has a breed association for the Estonian Horse.

References

Further reading 
 Den estniska hästen 
 Fakta om den estniska hästen
 Estnisk häst hos Breeds of Livestock

Horse breeds
Horse breeds originating in Estonia